Chuquisaca is represented in the Plurinational Legislative Assembly by four senators and their substitutes elected through proportional representation. They serve five-year terms and qualify for reelection indefinitely. The current delegation comprises two senators from the Movement for Socialism (MAS-IPSP) and two from Civic Community (CC): Roberto Padilla, Trinidad Rocha, Silvia Salame, and Santiago Ticona. Their respective substitutes are: Laura Parraga, Germán Moscoso, Jorge Antonio Zamora, and Sarai Reinaga. Although the bicameral system was adopted in the 1831 Constitution and was maintained in subsequently promulgated constitutions, it can be affirmed that with the exception of very small intervals, the Senate did not, in fact, exercise its functions until the convocation of the 1882 legislature. Furthermore, due to heavy political instability and frequent military interventions since 1882, Bolivia did not experience a continuous, uninterrupted legislative session until 1982.

List of senators

References

Notes

Footnotes

Bibliography 

 
 

 
Chuquisaca